This is a list of Minoan, Mycenaean, and related frescos and quasi-frescos (not completed before the plaster dried) found at Bronze Age archaeological sites on islands and in and around the shores of the Aegean Sea and other relevant places in the Eastern Mediterranean region. In cases where one civilization encroaches on another or a mixture of civilizations is present, both names are used.  Though culturally rather different, the Wall Paintings of Thera are regarded as part of Minoan art; all types form part of the wider grouping of Aegean art.

These frescos were primarily murals, few of which survived on their walls. Rather, the majority of frescos were reconstructed from flakes of fallen plaster and stucco, especially in those from Knossos and other sites in Crete. Fortunately those from Akrotiri have survived in more complete form.  They are often not the originals, but are either facsimiles of originals, or reconstructions including the original fragments, often as little as 5% of the total area, with the rest added in modern times.  Careful examination of the photos usually shows which areas are original. Often considerable artistic license has been exercised in the reconstruction. More than one reconstruction may exist, and more than one name have been assigned. The medium in all cases is plaster for interior walls, stucco for exterior walls. Often exterior frescos were in relief. Frescos can never be dated more precisely than the period in which they were painted. No names of painters have survived from the Bronze Age. Due to the necessity for extensive restoration, individual styles are typically not discernible, except those of the restorers; however, some scholars have assigned a school or painter name to a name fresco. These are not generally accepted.

List

Further reading

External links

 

Lists of paintings
Minoan frescos
Mycenaean Greece